Maria Leonidovna Rudnitskaya (June 17, 1916 – January 1, 1983) was a Russian Soviet realist painter, graphic artist, and art teacher, who lived and worked in Leningrad. She was a member of the Leningrad Union of Artists, regarded as one of representatives of the Leningrad school of painting.

Biography 
Maria Leonidovna Rudnitskaya was born June 17, 1916, in the city of Ekaterinoslav, Ukraine, Russian Empire, in family of railway engineer. In the years 1916-1927 Maria with her parents lived in Siberia for the construction of the Trans-Siberian Railway.

In 1932, after graduating from seven-year school Maria Rudnitskaya comes to Leningrad. In 1935 Maria Rudnitskaya entered at the Tavricheskaya Art School, where she studied of A. Gromov, S. Bootler, V. Levitsky, V. Oreshnikov, and M. Aslamazian.

In 1939 Maria Rudnitskaya graduated from Tavricheskaya Art School. In the same year she entered at the first cours of Department of Painting of the Leningrad Institute of Painting, Sculpture and Architecture, where she studied of Semion Abugov, Boris Fogel, Mikhail Bernshtein, and Igor Grabar.

In 1949, after a long break forced by the second world war and evacuation,  Maria Rudnitskaya graduated from the Leningrad Institute of Painting, Sculpture and Architecture named after Ilya Repin in the studio of Victor Oreshnikov, together with Nikolai Babasuk, Rostislav Vovkushevsky, Ivan Godlevsky, Valery Pimenov, Victor Teterin, and other young artists. Her graduation work was genre painting named "Motherhood".

Since 1949, Maria Rudnitskaya has participated in Art Exhibitions. She painted portraits, landscapes, still lifes, genre paintings, sketches done from nature. Maria Rudnitskaya tended to plein air painting. She has successfully worked in the genre of children's portraits. Her portraits of the inherent characteristics of precision, delicacy of tonal coloring and transferring of the plein air. Upon his return to Leningrad she taught first in the Secondary Art School, later at the Department of General Painting of the Higher School of Industrial Art named after Vera Mukhina.

Maria Rudnitskaya was a member of the Leningrad Union of Artists since 1949.

Maria Leonidovna Rudnitskaya died on January 1, 1983, in Leningrad at the sixty-seventh year of life. Her paintings reside in museums and private collections in England, France, Italy, in the U.S., Russia, and others.

References

Bibliography 
 Directory of Members of the Union of Artists of USSR. Volume 2.- Moscow: Soviet artist, 1979. - p. 287.
 Sergei V. Ivanov. Unknown Socialist Realism. The Leningrad School. - Saint Petersburg: NP-Print Edition, 2007. – pp. 135, 368, 388, 392-396, 407, 413, 415-417, 424. , .
 Anniversary Directory graduates of Saint Petersburg State Academic Institute of Painting, Sculpture, and Architecture named after Ilya Repin, Russian Academy of Arts. 1915 - 2005. - Saint Petersburg: Pervotsvet Publishing House, 2007. p. 61.

1916 births
1983 deaths
20th-century Russian painters
Soviet painters
Socialist realist artists
Leningrad School artists
Tavricheskaya Art School alumni
Repin Institute of Arts alumni
Russian women artists
Russian women painters
Members of the Leningrad Union of Artists
Soviet women artists
20th-century Russian women